Sadie Park Grisham (July 22, 1859 - November 10, 1928) was an educator and municipal public office-holder.

Early life
Sadie Park was born in Litchfield Township, Bradford County, Pennsylvania, on July 22, 1859. Grisham was a direct descendant of Josiah and Thomas Park, and was the daughter of J. P. and Jane A. Park. She spent the first ten years of her life in her native place. In 1870 her father moved with his family to Kansas and settled on Middle creek, in Chase County, Kansas. 

Sadie spent the greater part of her time in the common schools until 1876, at which time she went to the State Normal School in Emporia, Kansas, graduating in 1882.

Career
After graduation, Sadie Park engaged in school teaching, until December 1882, when she married Thomas Henry Grisham (1849-1918), a lawyer of Cottonwood Falls, Kansas, who was at that time the prosecuting attorney of Chase county. 

In 1886 Grisham accepted a position in the public schools of Cottonwood Falls. In 1890 she was employed as principal, with a corps of seven teachers. In the spring of 1889 she was elected a member of the common council of Cottonwood Falls. She was made president of the council and chairman of the committee on streets and alleys.

Personal life
She died on November 10, 1928, and is buried at Prairie Grove Cemetery, Cottonwood Falls, with her husband.

References

1859 births
1928 deaths
People from Bradford County, Pennsylvania
Educators from Pennsylvania
American women educators
Wikipedia articles incorporating text from A Woman of the Century